Globulidrilus is a genus of annelids belonging to the family Enchytraeidae.

Species:
 Globulidrilus helgei Christensen & Dózsa-Farkas, 2012 
 Globulidrilus riparius (Bretscher, 1899)

References

Annelids